Mohan Mallikarjunagouda Shantanagoudar (5 May 1958 – 25 April 2021) was an Indian jurist, and former Judge of the Supreme court of India.

He served as Chief Justice of Kerala High Court.

Biography
Justice Shantanagoudar initially practiced at the Karnataka High Court as an advocate, and was later appointed an Additional Judge in 2003, and elevated as a permanent judge of the Karnataka High Court on 29 September 2004. He was appointed the acting chief justice of the Kerala High Court on 1 August 2016 and later as Chief Justice of the Kerala High Court on 22 September 2016. In February 2017, Justice Shantanagoudar was appointed a Judge of the Supreme Court of India by the then President of India, Pranab Mukherjee.

He died during service on 24 April 2021, at Medanta Hospital in Gurgaon, due to pneumonia and post COVID-19 complications. He is survived by his wife and children.

References

1958 births
21st-century Indian judges
2021 deaths
Judges of the Karnataka High Court
Chief Justices of the Kerala High Court
20th-century Indian judges
People from Haveri district
20th-century Indian lawyers
Justices of the Supreme Court of India
Deaths from the COVID-19 pandemic in India